Alexander Brattell is a British photographer best known for his abstract monochrome fine art prints which examine the role of visual perception in non-verbal thought.

Biography

Early years

Brattell's interest in photography started when he was a psychology undergraduate at Liverpool University in 1981 with an ambition to become a writer. Comfortable with a camera from the outset, what was intended to be a visual diary to accompany writing projects soon took centre stage. His first published picture was a portrait of professor Patrick Minford for The Financial Times. In 1982 Brattell's photographs of the author William S. Burroughs were purchased by his publisher, John Calder.

When his request to transfer his degree to a media subject was declined Brattell left university to pursue photography full-time. He was the staff photographer and writer for the Liverpool Music and Art fanzine "Breakout" until he began several years of employment in the photographic industry as a social & commercial location and studio photographer. He became freelance in 1986. By this time he had already established his fine art practice and was regularly exhibiting his prints in shops and restaurants. His first solo exhibition was at Veronica's Restaurant in Bayswater West London in 1984.

Main career

Moving to a studio and darkroom in Poplar, East London in 1987, Brattell divided his time between commissions from design companies and PR agencies, editorial assignments and making prints of his personal images. He freelanced for The Sunday Telegraph for 14 years under picture editor Nigel Skelsey and worked for diverse publications including The Times, Arena, GQ, Esquire, Vogue, Tandoori, Skin Two magazine, Square Meal and Fortean Times. His work with musicians continued through work for fRoots magazine and with The Big Chill, then a small Sunday club event planning their first festival, for whom he photographed, co-wrote (as Headonastick) and co-edited the Big Chill magazine "ON" (1995–1996).

Commercial clients during a 25-year period have included PricewaterhouseCoopers, CVC Capital Partners, Freud Communications' and international hotel design company Hirsch Bedner Associates. Brattell resisted specialising, enjoying the contrasts and challenges offered by a combination of still life, food, interiors and portraiture.

In 1996 Brattell began teaching part-time, first at Cordwainers College Hackney, then at The London College of Fashion.
He has facilitated numerous community projects and student exhibitions at venues ranging from The Whitechapel Gallery to doctors surgeries.

At the end of 2005 Brattell relocated to St Leonards on Sea, East Sussex with his partner the jewellery artist Jo McAllister and their young son. He continues to accept commissions, most usually from artists, performers and craftspeople, teaches photography part-time at Sussex Coast College Hastings and exhibits regularly. He increasingly works with galleries such as F-ish, Hastings (curating), The De La Warr Pavilion, Bexhill (art projects in primary schools) and Towner, Eastbourne (exhibition events).

His fine art practice weaves an unbroken thread through his career resulting in bodies of work and series of pictures from Britain, Poland, Italy, Southern Africa, Morocco, Egypt and the Western United States. His multi-series work centred on London's East End has attracted particular attention, being chosen for display by The Prince's Foundation and the 2010 London International Documentary Festival.

Influences

Through encountering the work and writings of mid-twentieth century American avant garde photographers of the 1940s and 1950s such as Minor White, Harry Callahan and Aaron Suskind, Brattell realised that it was Alfred Stieglitz's theory of Equivalents that could best help him verbalise his own work. Like those artists his work is not primarily concerned with the subjects that it depicts and is therefore closer to the concerns of surrealism and abstract expressionism than traditional or post-modern modes in photography.

Other important influences on Brattell's work include the English proto-surrealist Austin Osman Spare (1886–1956), writers J. G. Ballard (1930–2009) and William S. Burroughs (1914–1997).

Exhibitions 

Solo exhibitions:

The Sun Does Not Move; Conquest Hospital Hastings. Sep - Nov 2012. Eastbourne District Hospital. Dec 2012 - Feb 2013.
Tulpa. Marina Post Office Tearooms. St. Leonards On Sea. October - November 2010.
The Edge of England: McCarrons, St Leonards On Sea, East Sussex 2009
Word on the Street: Royal London Hospital, Whitechapel. October 2004 – January 2005
19 Hz: The Spitz Bistro, London E1. October 2004
Antinomy: The Fashion Space Gallery, London College of Fashion, London. November 2003
Lines of Desire: The Space, London. June – July 2003
Spectacle: The Eye Company, London. 2002
Last Minute: The Alex, London. 2002
britart.com: Foyer exhibition, London. 2000
Paul Mark Hatton Jewellery: London. 2000
Portals and Spirits: The Clerks House, London. 1999
Freuds Cafe Gallery: London W1. 1992
Brattell in Poland: Polish Social & Cultural Association Gallery, London W6. 1990

Group exhibitions:

They’re Not Laughing Now: F-ISH gallery, Hastings. Exhibitor & curator. October 2010
The Invisible City: London International Documentary Festival. Exhibitor & speaker. April 2010
IPG's Greatest Hits: The Independent Photographers Gallery, Battle, December 2009
Indian Summer: Hastings Museum & Art Gallery, September 2009
Conversations...From the Edge: Photo Hub Group, St Mary In The Castle Hastings, September 2009
Jack in the Green: Hastings Arts Forum, St. Leonards on Sea, May 2008, 2009, 2010
Shadowlands: South Coast Artists. Arts Forum, St. Leonards on Sea, March 2008
Spirit of the Season: The Independent Photographers Gallery, Battle, Dec 2007 – Jan 2008
Regeneration: SoCo Gallery, Hastings, March 2007
Seaside: Conquest Hospital, Hastings, August – November 2006
South Coast Artists Spring Show: SoCo Gallery Hastings, May 2006
Landscape Through the Lens: SoCo Gallery Hastings, January 2006
War!: The Rivington Gallery, London. June 2003
Looking at London: The Prince’s Foundation, London. 2002
London College of Fashion Faculty Show: London W1, 2001
Cordwainers College Faculty Exhibitions: 1997, 1998, 1999
Spitalfields, A Last Lingering Look: The Clerks House, Shoreditch. 1999
Smalls: The Clerks House, Shoreditch, 1998
Camerawork Open Exhibition: London E2, 1990

Galleries:

 Eyestorm
 Lucy Bell Fine Art Photography

Books
Fetish – Masterpieces of Erotic Fantasy Photography – Carlton Books 
They're Not Laughing Now - F‐ISH Gallery (Oct 2010)
London Road - Zetetic Press (2011)

Magazines
 Skin Two magazine: 26, "The Story of Zero" Cover Photo  & fashion feature (1998) 
 3000AD: 2000 AD Anniversary Supplement (Mar 1997)

External links 
zetetic.co.uk
brattell.com
Alexander Brattell at Britart

Photographers from Liverpool
Living people
Year of birth missing (living people)